Puzhou or Pu Prefecture was a zhou (prefecture) in imperial China, centering on modern Juancheng County, Shandong, China. It existed (intermittently) from 596 until 1913.

See also
Puyang Commandery

References
 

Prefectures of Later Han (Five Dynasties)
Prefectures of the Tang dynasty
Prefectures of the Sui dynasty
Prefectures of Later Tang
Prefectures of Later Liang (Five Dynasties)
Prefectures of Later Jin (Five Dynasties)
Prefectures of the Song dynasty
Former prefectures in Shandong
Former prefectures in Henan
Prefectures of Later Zhou
Prefectures of the Jin dynasty (1115–1234)
Prefectures of the Yuan dynasty
Subprefectures of the Ming dynasty
Departments of the Qing dynasty